"Midnight in Chelsea" is a song by American rock singer Jon Bon Jovi, released as the first single from his second solo album, Destination Anywhere (1997), in June 1997. The song is written and produced by Bon Jovi and Dave Stewart, and is Bon Jovi's highest-charting solo single in the UK, reaching number four on the UK Singles Chart. The song also charted at number 29 on the US Billboard Adult Top 40, number 30 on the Billboard Mainstream Top 40 chart, and number 11 in Canada. Its highest peak was in Spain, where it reached number one for two weeks.

Music video
The song's video was shot in the Chelsea neighborhood of Manhattan, with the Hotel Chelsea as a primary location. However, the song is actually about the London neighbourhood from which the Manhattan locale indirectly took its name, as evidenced by lyrics that refer to London topics such as Sloane Rangers, The Sun and "a big red bus". The usual description of lyrics do not include capital letters for The Sun. The music video was released on the DVD Destination Anywhere: The Film.

Critical reception
Larry Flick from Billboard wrote, "You may need to double-check the CD single sleeve to remind yourself that this is, in fact, a Jon Bon Jovi recording. The man who has made millions of teenage girls swoon with his pop/metal musings previews his forthcoming solo outing, "Destination Anywhere", with a sharply time-sensitive slice of funk/rock. This richly textured track opens with a shuffling, hip-hop-spiked drum loop that will unlock many a top 40 door without turning off faithful mainstream rock stations. However, Bon Jovi and co-producer Dave Stewart wisely steer down an appropriately guitar-paved road after the first few bars of the song. Factor in a markedly more mature and restrained vocal and a maddeningly memorable la-la-la chorus, and you have the makings of a smash that will ring in a bright new career phase for the artist." David Sinclair from The Times viewed the song as a "middle-of-the-road taster" from Bon Jovi's solo album.

Track listings
All songs were written by Jon Bon Jovi. Additional writers are credited in parentheses.

 UK and Australian CD1 
 "Midnight in Chelsea" (single edit)  – 4:03
 "Sad Song Night"  – 4:11
 "August 7" (acoustic version) – 4:12
 "Midnight in Chelsea" (album version)  – 4:58

 UK and Australian CD2 
 "Midnight in Chelsea" (single edit)  – 4:03
 "Drive" (demo) – 4:14
 "Every Word Was a Piece of My Heart" (Dave Stuart mix) – 4:39
 "Midnight in Chelsea" (album version)  – 4:58

 UK cassette single and European CD single 
 "Midnight in Chelsea" (single edit)  – 4:03
 "Midnight in Chelsea" (album version)  – 4:58

Credits and personnel
Credits are lifted from the Destination Anywhere album booklet.

Recording
 Written in London, March 1996
 Recorded and produced at Right Track Studios (New York City), December 1996
 Mixed at A&M Studios (Hollywood, California)
 Remixed at Quad Studios (New York City)
 Mastered at Sterling Sound (New York City)

Personnel

 Jon Bon Jovi – writing, vocals, backing vocals, guitar, production
 Dave Stewart – writing, guitar, production
 Zhana Saunders – backing vocals
 Hugh McDonald – bass
 Alex Silva – keyboards, programming
 Kenny Aronoff – drums
 Teese Gohl – string arrangement

 Obie O'Brien – mixing, engineering, remixing
 Jim Labinski – mixing assistant
 Peter Karam – engineering assistant
 Ann Mincieli – remixing assistant
 Mike Rew – remixing assistant
 George Marino – mastering

Charts

Weekly charts

Year-end charts

Release history

References

External links
 

Jon Bon Jovi songs
1996 songs
1997 singles
Mercury Records singles
Music videos directed by Mark Pellington
Number-one singles in Spain
Song recordings produced by Jon Bon Jovi
Songs written by David A. Stewart
Songs written by Jon Bon Jovi